Korolivka is a village located on the Tupa River in Chortkiv Raion of Ternopil Oblast in western Ukraine. It belongs to Borshchiv urban hromada, one of the hromadas of Ukraine. Korolivka belongs to the administration of Holovchyntsi village. Located near it is Optymistychna Cave, the longest cave in Eurasia.

Until 18 July 2020, Korolivka belonged to Borshchiv Raion. The raion was abolished in July 2020 as part of the administrative reform of Ukraine, which reduced the number of raions of Ternopil Oblast to three. The area of Borshchiv Raion was merged into Chortkiv Raion.

Religion 
In the village is the stone church of the Resurrection of Jesus Christ, built in 1997.

Population 
The population of the village was 92 as of 2001.

People from Korolivka 
 Mykhailo Hnydiuk, scientist and doctor
 Jacob Frank, founder of Frankism, born in Korolivka in 1726

References

Notes

Sources 
 
 Ірина Мадзій. Королівка, яка народжувалась двічі // «Вільне життя плюс». — 2014. — No. 91 (12 лист.). — С. 12.

Villages in Chortkiv Raion